The Sicilian cart (or carretto siciliano in Italian and carrettu sicilianu in Sicilian or carretti (plural)) is an ornate, colorful style of horse or donkey-drawn cart native to the island of Sicily, in Italy.

History
The carts were used for the transportation of goods throughout the island from the 19th to the 20th century. Carts reached the height of their popularity in the 1920s, when many thousand were on the island. Miniature carts, or Carrettini Siciliani, are often sold in Sicily (or in Italian shops and restaurants in other countries) as souvenirs. The Museo del Carretto Siciliano, in Terrasini, in the province of Palermo, is a museum dedicated to the carts.

Use
Sicilian wood carver George Petralia states that horses were mostly used in the city and flat plains, while donkeys or mules were more often used in rough terrain for hauling heavy loads. The cart has two wheels and is primarily handmade out of wood with iron metal components. Carts called "Carretti da Lavoro" (carts for work) are used for hauling miscellaneous light loads such as produce, wood, wine, and people, and "Carretti da Gara" are carts for festive occasions such as weddings and parades. The Carretto is like the 'taxi' or 'truck' of today.

In modern-day Sicily, the tradition continues in small, three-wheeled motorized vehicles (called Ape), which can be found painted in the traditional way.

Fabrication
The crews that built carretti included woodcarvers, metal workers, and painters. The woodcarvers carved the many panels that were often historic reliefs.  The metal workers worked the iron, in a 'ferro battuto' style, which included highly decorated metal undercarriages.

The Sicilian Carretto is made in several provinces in Sicily each with their own style.  Carretti made in the province of  Palermo have more of a square box design, those made in Catania are made with more elaborate 'keys', and then there are the carts made in Agrigento which have their own distinctive style.

The craft of making the carts is handed down from generation to generation, through the training of apprentices. Carts are known for being covered in carvings and brightly painted scenes from Sicilian history and folklore as well as intricate geometrical designs. These scenes also served the purpose of conveying historical information to those who were illiterate. The colors of Sicily's flag, yellow and red, feature prominently on the carts, along with details in bright blues and greens. The animals pulling the carts are often elaborately adorned as well.

References

External links

 Details of a Cart
 George Concetto Petralia: Scultori di Carretti - Sicilian Woodcarver
Photos from the Museo del Carretto Siciliano

Culture of Sicily
Carts
Decorated vehicles
Folk art